Metropolitan Conference or Metro Conference may refer to:

 Met-Intercollegiate Conference, an NCAA Division III conference from 1979 to 1984
 Metro Conference (Metropolitan Collegiate Athletic Conference), NCAA Division I conference that became Conference USA
 Metro Conference, the original name of the North East Collegiate Volleyball Association, an NCAA Division III men's volleyball-only conference that operated from 1995 to 2011
 Metropolitan Conference (1923–1931), a college football conference in New York from 1923 to 1931
 Metropolitan Collegiate Conference, NCAA conference from 1965 to 1969
 Metropolitan Collegiate Hockey Conference, ACHA Division 3 league
 Metropolitan Intercollegiate Conference, an NCAA Division III conference from 1972 to 1977
 Metropolitan Interscholastic Conference, high school athletic conference based in Central and Western Indiana
 Metropolitan New York Conference, NCAA conference from 1933 to 1963
 Metropolitan Swimming Conference, intercollegiate swimming conference
 Metro Atlantic Athletic Conference, current NCAA Division I conference
 ECAC-Metro Conference, former name of the Northeast Conference